Laura Sims is an American novelist and poet. In 2017, Sims' debut novel Looker sparked a bidding war, which ultimately resulted in a major deal with Scribner. The book follows the spiraling descent of a woman obsessed—with the end of her marriage, with her inability to have a child, with her infuriatingly bourgeois Brooklyn neighborhood, and with her movie star neighbor. It was released on January 8, 2019. Sims's second novel, How Can I Help You comes out in July, 2023.

Biography
Sims is the author of four books of poetry: Staying Alive (Ugly Duckling Presse, 2016), My god is this a man, Stranger, and Practice, Restraint (Fence Books). In 2014, powerHouse Books published Fare Forward: Letters from David Markson, compiled and edited by Sims. She has published five poetry chapbooks, including POST- (Goodmorning Menagerie, 2011). Her poetry has appeared in numerous literary journals, including Aufgabe, Black Clock, Black Warrior Review, Colorado Review, Columbia Poetry Review, Crayon, and Denver Quarterly, among others. She has published book reviews and essays in Boston Review, New England Review, Rain Taxi, and The Review of Contemporary Fiction. Her honors include the 2005 Fence Books Alberta Prize for Practice, Restraint and a Creative Artists Exchange Fellowship from the Japan-US Friendship Commission in 2006.

Sims is a graduate of the College of William and Mary. She received a Master of Fine Arts degree from the University of Washington. She is a professor of creative writing, literature and composition who currently teaches at New York University. She has been a featured writer for Harriet, the Poetry Foundation's blog, and she is a co-editor of Instance Press with poets Elizabeth Robinson, Beth Anderson, and Susanne Dyckman. She lives in South Orange, New Jersey.

Published works

Novels 
 Looker (Scribner, 8 January 2019)

Poetry books
 Staying Alive (Ugly Duckling Presse, 2016)
 My god is this a man (Fence Books, 2014)
 Stranger (Fence Books, 2009)
 Practice, Restraint (Fence Books, 2005)

Nonfiction books
 Fare Forward: Letters from David Markson (powerHouse Books, 2014)

Chapbooks
 POST- (Goodmorning Menagerie Press, 2012)
 Bank Book (Answer Tag Press, 2004)

Recent poems
 Excerpt from Staying Alive on Omniverse blog
 Excerpt from Staying Alive in Gulf Coast
Excerpt from Staying Alive in Black Clock

References

External links 
 
Profile page on "Harriet", the literary blog of the Poetry Foundation
Author Archive on "Harriet"
Ugly Duckling Presse Page for Staying Alive
Fence Books Author Page

Interviews 
 Interview with Tyler Malone on Full Stop
 Conversation with Cathy Wagner in The Conversant
 Interview with Joseph Massey on Studio One blog
 Spotlight on Coldfront
 Interview with Kate Greenstreet on kickingwind

Reviews 
 Review of My god is this a man at Tarpaulin Sky
 Review of My god is this a man at Rain Taxi
 Review of My god is this a man at The Volta
 Review of Fare Forward at New York Times
 Review of Fare Forward at Chicago Tribune
 Review of Fare Forward at Winnipeg Review
 Review of Stranger at Bookslut
 Review of Stranger at Coldfront
 Review of Practice, Restraint at HTMLgiant

21st-century American poets
College of William & Mary alumni
Writers from Richmond, Virginia
Living people
American women poets
21st-century American women writers
Year of birth missing (living people)